Equestrian competitions were contested by participating nations at the 1995 Pan American Games in Mar del Plata, Argentina.

Events

Medal table

See also
 Equestrian at the 1996 Summer Olympics

References 
  .
 

Events at the 1995 Pan American Games
1995
1995 in equestrian
Equestrian sports competitions in Argentina